Larry Herrington, known by his stage name Carmouflage Rose, is an Australian musician, singer, songwriter and rapper. He has played at Australian festivals and events including: Spilt Milk and Groovin The Moo. Larry signed a deal with Sony Music Australia in 2018. His song "Late Nights" was streamed 8.5 million times and was one of the top 30 songs played Triple J in 2017, and was the Gold in 2018.

On 19 March 2021, Carmouflage Rose released the double-A sided single "Tipsy"/"Powerplay".

Discography

Extended plays

Singles

Awards

Queensland Music Awards
The Queensland Music Awards (previously known as Q Song Awards) are annual awards celebrating Queensland, Australia's brightest emerging artists and established legends. They commenced in 2006.
 
|-
| 2020
| "Sele"
| Hip Hop / Rap Song of the Year
| 
|-

References

Australian musicians
Living people
Sony Music Australia artists
Year of birth missing (living people)